Dale Eugene Chadwick was an American football coach and collegiate athletic director. He was a graduate of Marietta College in Marietta, Ohio. He served as the head football coach at Shurtleff College in Alton, Illinois in 1908, at Dakota Wesleyan University in Mitchell, South Dakota from 1909 to 1910, and at Mississippi College from 1911 to 1912.

References

Year of birth missing
Year of death missing
Albion Britons football coaches
Dakota Wesleyan Tigers athletic directors
Dakota Wesleyan Tigers football coaches
Marietta Pioneers football coaches
Mississippi College Choctaws football coaches
Shurtleff Pioneers athletic directors
Shurtleff Pioneers football coaches
Marietta College alumni